Pierre-Maximilien Delafontaine (1777 – 1 December 1860) was a French painter. After a long illness he re-established himself as a bronze sculptor.

Life
He was born in Paris to Jean-Baptiste-Maximilien Delafontaine and Marie-Louise de La Brière. He studied under Jacques-Louis David. He exhibited at the Paris Salons 1798 and 1799. According to the Salon catalogues, he lived at 123 rue Saint-Honoré, in the Hôtel d'Aligre. On 23 June 1800 he married Émilie-Claude Herbillon from the Pont-sur-Seine. He died in Paris.

Works 
 The Skater (Bertrand Andrieu), 1798 (Hôtel de la Monnaie)
 Portrait of Xavier Bichat, 1799 (Musée national du Château de Versailles)
 Portrait of Alexandre Lenoir, 19th century

1777 births
1860 deaths
18th-century French painters
French male painters
19th-century French painters
Pupils of Jacques-Louis David
Artists from Paris
19th-century French sculptors
French male sculptors
18th-century French male artists